Laos national basketball team is the basketball team from Laos, administered by the Fédération de Basketball du Laos

They have yet to prove they can compete with any major teams in the world, and they are yet to qualify for the FIBA Asia Championship or the FIBA World Championship.

Competitive performance

Summer Olympics
Yet to qualify

World championships
Yet to qualify

FIBA Asia Cup

Asian Games

Yet to qualify

Southeast Asian Championship

1994-1996 : Did not participate
1998 : 8th place
2001-2013 : Did not participate
2015 : 5th place
2017 : Did not participate

Southeast Asian Games

1977 : Did not participate
1979-1983 : ?
1985 : Did not participate
1987-1989 : ?
1991 : Did not participate
1993 : ?
1995 : 7th place
1997 : Did not participate
1999 : ?
2001-2015 : Did not participate
2017 : 8th place
2019 : Did not participate
2021 : To be determined

Current roster
Roster for the 2017 Southeast Asian Games.

|}
| valign="top" |
Head coach
S. Wei
Assistant coaches

Legend
Club – describes lastclub before the tournament
Age – describes ageon 9 September 2017
|}

Depth chart

Kit

Manufacturer
Adidas

External links
Laos Basketball Records at FIBA Archive
Asia-Basket – Laos
Presentation on Facebook
Laos Basketball Federation at facebook

Videos
KL2017 Men's Basketball 8t/9th Placing - MYA 🇲🇲 vs LAO 🇱🇦 | 26/08/2017 Youtube.com video

References

Sport in Laos
Men's national basketball teams
Basketball in Laos
1965 establishments in Laos
National sports teams of Laos